William Grant Lewi II (June 8, 1902 – July 14 or 15, 1951) was an American astrologer and author.

Best known for his books Astrology for the Millions and Heaven Knows What, Lewi has been described as the father of modern astrology in America.

Life

Lewi was born in Albany, New York. He attended Hamilton College and graduated from Columbia University.  He taught English at Dartmouth College, the University of North Dakota, and at the University of Delaware.

Lewi married Carolyn Wallace in 1926.  He began his study of astrology with his mother-in-law, Athene Gale Wallace.

In 1934, Lewi began working as a professional astrologer.

In 1935, Lewi's book Heaven Knows What was published under the pseudonym Scorpio.  Lewi pioneered chart synthesis with 144 Sun/Moon sign delineations and aspect cross-references that he developed on the basis of thousands of questionnaire responses.

In 1940, Astrology for the Millions was published.  In it he provided a short outline of his life.

Lewi edited Horoscope Magazine in the late 1930s and 1940s.

Lewi began his own magazine, The Astrologer, in 1950.

Lewi moved to Arizona in the early 1950s, and died July 15, 1951. He has been described as "the father of modern astrology in America".

Works

 1935: Star of Empire: A Novel (New York: Vanguard Press).
 1935: Heaven Knows What, under the pseudonym Scorpio (Garden City, New York: Doubleday, Doran & company, inc.).
 1937: The Gods Arrive: A Novel of American Life and American Business, 1928-1935 (Philadelphia, London: J. B. Lippincott Company).
 1940: Astrology for the Millions (New York: Doubleday, Doran and company).
 1946: Your Greatest Strength (Philadelphia: David McKay company).

References
The Astrology Encyclopedia by James R. Lewis (Detroit: Gale Research; 1994)

External links
The Gemini Pioneer of Free Will Astrology, Grant Lewi by Robert Wilkinson

20th-century astrologers
1902 births
1951 deaths
American astrologers
Writers from Albany, New York
Hamilton College (New York) alumni
Columbia University alumni
Dartmouth College faculty
University of Delaware faculty
University of North Dakota faculty